Tissa may refer to:

People
Prince Tissa, Sinhalese regent of the Kingdom of Tambapanni (454 BC–437 BC)
Vitashoka, the brother of Ashoka, called Tissa in the Southern Buddhist tradition
Tissa (prince), viceroy of Vientiane, took part in Lao rebellion (1826–1828)
Tissa Balasuriya (1924–2013), Sri Lankan Roman Catholic priest and theologian
Tissa Wijeyeratne (1923–2002), former Sri Lankan barrister, diplomat and businessman
Tissa Vitharana (born 1934), Sri Lankan academic and politician

Places
Tissa, Germany, municipality in Thuringia, Germany
Tissa, Cameroon, settlement of the Bata people
Tisza, tributary of the Danube
Tissa, India, village in the Muzaffarnagar district of Uttar Pradesh, and one of the twelve villages comprising the Saadat-e-Bara
Tissa, Morocco

See also
Hermits Tissa and Thiha, Burmese Buddhist monks

Sinhalese masculine given names